The women's long jump at the 2009 World Championships in Athletics was held at the Olympic Stadium on 21 and 23 August.

In the final, Olympic champion Maurren Higa Maggi took the early lead as the first jumper in the competition.  After three fouls, the second legal jump of the competition took Brittney Reese into the lead with a 6.92m.  Tatyana Lebedeva's second round 6.97m put her into the lead for six jumps until Reese could take her third jump.  Her season best tying  settled the competition.  No athlete improved over the final three rounds.

In 2017, silver medalist Lebedeva's 2008 Olympic doping sample was retested and found positive for dehydrochlormethyltestosterone (turinabol).  Her Olympic medal was revoked.  Ordinarily, a doping violation is followed by a two year ban which would include this championship.  No changes in medals have been announced yet.

Medalists

Records
Prior to the competition, the following records were as follows.

No new records were set during this competition.

Qualification standards

Schedule

Results

Qualification
Qualification: Qualifying Performance 6.75 (Q) or at least 12 best performers (q) advance to the final.

Key: DNS = Did not start, Q = qualification by place in heat, q = qualification by overall place

Final

Key: NR = National record, SB = Seasonal best, WL = World leading (in a given season)

References
 Long jump qualification from IAAF (Archived 2009-09-08). IAAF. Retrieved on 2009-08-26.
 Long jump final results from IAAF. IAAF. Retrieved on 2009-08-26.

Long Jump W
Long jump at the World Athletics Championships
2009 in women's athletics